Ingeborg Magnusdotter of Sweden (born 1277, Sweden – d. 5 April or 15 August 1319) was Queen of Denmark by marriage to King Eric VI. She was the daughter of King Magnus III of Sweden and Helwig of Holstein.

Life

Ingeborg was born a daughter of King Magnus III of Sweden and Helwig of Holstein.

In 1288, she was engaged to marry to King Eric Menved of Denmark, a marriage which took place in Helsingborg in 1296.   The marriage was as a part of dynastic policies: in 1298, her brother king Birger of Sweden married her husband's sister, Princess Martha of Denmark. The dispensation necessary for the marriage was not obtained until 1297 because of the conflict between her spouse and the archbishop Jens Grand.

Queen

Queen Ingeborg was described as beautiful and tender; songs describe how she asked for a prison amnesty at her wedding, and contemporary songs both in Denmark and Sweden praise her for her compassion and sense of justice.  She was a popular queen in Denmark, where she was referred to as "gode Frue" or 'the Good Lady'.

There is no information that she ever played any political role. Her husband was the ally of her eldest brother, King Birger, and her husband's sister queen Martha of Sweden during the Swedish throne conflicts: they received their son in 1306 after the Håtuna games, and later Birger and Martha themselves as refugees after the Nyköping Banquet in 1318.

She had eight sons who died as children, as well as six miscarriages, although the sources differ between eight and fourteen children: whatever the case, her many pregnancies led to miscarriages, or the birth of children who died soon after.

In 1318, Queen Ingeborg gave birth to a son who lived, which was a cause of great celebrations after so many miscarriages.  However, when the queen showed off the infant to the public from her carriage, the carriage suddenly broke and fell over, during which the infant fell from her grip, broke his neck and died.

Later life

After the death of her son, she entered the St. Catherine's Priory, Roskilde.  The reason for this is contradictory.   One version claims that she did this voluntarily; either because of sorrow for the death of her son, or alternatively, because of her grief caused by the deaths of her brothers, Erik Magnusson and Valdemar Magnusson.

According to another legend, she was forcibly confined to the convent by her husband, who blamed her for the death of their son.  According to another version, he had her imprisoned for being too involved in the political causes of her brothers.

Regardless of whether she was a guest or a prisoner of the monastery, it is known that she had been the benefactor of this particular convent prior to entering it.

In 1319, she allegedly foretold the death of herself, her spouse and the archbishop. She died soon after, followed by her husband.

She was buried in Ringsted Kirke with the inscription: 
"I, Ingeborg of Sweden, once queen of Denmark, ask for forgiveness from anyone to whom I may have caused sorrow, to be please to forgive me and to remember my soul. I died in the year of Our Lord 1319."

References

 Dehn-Henning Nielsen: Kings och Queens i Danmark, Copenhagen 2007, 
 Kay Nielsen, Ib Askholm: Danmarks kongelige familier i 1000 år, 2007,  Kay Nielsen, Ib Askholm: Danmarks Kongelige familier i 1000 år, 2007, 
 Rikke Agnete Olsen: Kongerækken, København 2005,  Rikke Agnete Olsen: Kongerækken, København 2005, 
  Salmonsens konversationsleksikon / Anden Udgave / Bind XII: Hvene—Jernbaner 
 Dansk biografisk Lexikon / VIII. Bind. Holst - Juul

	

Ingiburga 1277
1277 births
1319 deaths
Danish royal consorts
14th-century Danish nuns
Burials at St. Bendt's Church, Ringsted
13th-century Danish women
14th-century Danish women
Daughters of kings